Damian Driscoll (born 12 May 1972) is a former professional rugby league footballer who played as a  for the Western Suburbs Magpies, Gold Coast Chargers, Manly-Warringah Sea Eagles, Northern Eagles and Salford City Reds in the 1990s and 2000s.

References

1972 births
Living people
Australian rugby league players
Gold Coast Chargers players
Manly Warringah Sea Eagles players
Northern Eagles players
Rugby league props
Salford Red Devils players
Western Suburbs Magpies players